Katharine Chang (born 12 February 1953) is a Taiwanese diplomat.

Early life
Chang obtained her bachelor's degree from the Department of Diplomacy of National Chengchi University. She then obtained her master's degree in international relations from Long Island University in the United States.

Career
Chang began her diplomatic career in 1976. In January 1995, she was named leader of the Taipei Economic and Cultural Office in Seattle, and became the first woman to serve as a representative of Taiwan. In 1997, Chang was appointed Taiwan's first woman ambassador when she accepted a post to St Kitts and Nevis and Dominica. Upon succeeding Henry Chen as director-general of the Department of Information and Cultural Affairs, Chang became the Ministry of Foreign Affairs first spokeswoman. She was the ROC representative to the United Kingdom from 2007 to 2011 and to Australia from 2011 to 2014. The next year, she was appointed to lead the Taipei Economic and Cultural Representative Office in the United States. In 2016, Chang was named the minister of the Mainland Affairs Council. She left the Mainland Affairs Council in February 2018, and succeeded Tien Hung-mao as leader of the Straits Exchange Foundation that March. Chang was replaced at the SEF by David Lee on 5 June 2020.

References

1953 births
Living people
National Chengchi University alumni
Long Island University alumni
Taiwanese Ministers of Foreign Affairs
Women government ministers of Taiwan
Government ministers of Taiwan
Taiwanese women ambassadors
Ambassadors of the Republic of China to Saint Kitts and Nevis
Representatives of Taiwan to Australia
Representatives of Taiwan to the Netherlands
Representatives of Taiwan to the United Kingdom